Kevin Rodrigues, better known as Worakls (born 28 September 1988), is a French DJ and electronic musician.

Rodrigues, who comes from a musical family, started learning the piano at age 3. After studying at a conservatory, he dedicated his time to electronic music and composition. He has found success with his remixes as well as his solo material.
In November 2014, he founded the label Hungry Music with his friends N'to and Joachim Pastor.

A 2015 review in Billboard magazine referred to Worakls as a "rising French DJ" and described his tracks as "serious techno with a light touch", "full of focused, nervous energy."

As of 2019, Worakls has released one studio album, several EPs, and numerous singles.

Discography

Studio albums
 Orchestra (2019)
 Sur Le Front Des Animaux Menacés (2020)

EPs
 Unity (2008)
 All Night Long (2009)
 Shazam (2009)
 Deeply Infected (2009)
 When the Birds Go in the Wrong Way (2010)
 Folie (2010)
 Rapafromage (2012 - with Nicolas Cuer)
 Good Night My Love (2013)
 Et la pluie tomba (2013)
 Question réponse (2015)

Compilation albums
 Hungry 5 (The Best of 5 Years) (2018 - compilation of Hungry Music artists)

Singles
 "Future" (2010)
 "Tension" (2010)
 "Mirage" (2011)
 "Siehst Du Nicht (feat. Coni)" (2012)
 "Utopia/Porto" (2014 - with N'to)
 "Salzburg" (2014)
 "Flocon de neige" (2014)
 "Toi/Cerisier blanc" (2015)
 "Adagio for Square" (2015)
 "Mellotron" (2016)
 "Nocturne" (2017)
 "Sanctis" (2017)

References

External links
 
 Hungry Music official website
 Sonate Records official website (for Worakls Orchestra information)

French DJs
French record producers
Living people
1988 births